Lake Ann is a lake in Carver County, Minnesota, in the United States.

Fishing
Lake Ann contains various species of fish including black, brown and yellow bullheads, banded killifish, black crappie, blackchin shiner, bluegill, central mudminnow, largemouth bass, northern pike, pumpkinseed, walleye, white sucker, yellow perch, common carp, Bluntnose minnow, golden shiner, Johnny darter, Spottail shiner as well as two species of sunfish: green and hybrid. Lake Ann has two invasive species: Brittle naiad and Eurasian watermilfoil

In 2018, Lake Ann has special fishing regulations:
Largemouth Bass: catch-and-release only.
Northern Pike: All from 24-36’’ must be immediately released. Possession limit three, only one over 36”.

History

Native American tribes occupied the lake long before European settlers.

French-Canadian trappers and fur traders arrived from the Hudson-Bay Company but soon were replaced by the American Fur Company.  However, Lake Ann soon became a site for those interested in lumbering.  During this time, towns and camps emerged.  Lake Ann got its name from the wife of William S. Judd, an early settler.  Early settlements were known for their local legends. Present-day historical societies have collections of newspaper clippings and hand-written accounts describing celebrity trappers, lumberjacks, and river drovers.

In the 1970s, Chanhassen developed its first city park on the south shore of the lake, known as Lake Ann Park.  The park was built during a population growth spur.  The park was part of a redevelopment plan which included adding more companies to the area, which brought in more residents. Today, Lake Ann Park in one of many parks in the city.

See also
List of lakes in Minnesota
Chanhassen, Minnesota
The Temple of Eck on Lake Ann

References

Lakes of Minnesota
Lakes of Carver County, Minnesota